Who Do You Think You Are? is a Canadian television documentary series, which aired on CBC Television during the 2007-2008 television season. It was on Thursday evenings at 7:30 p.m. starting October 11, 2007. Based on the earlier BBC series Who Do You Think You Are?, each episode profiled a Canadian celebrity tracing their family tree. The series was announced in June 2007 as part of CBC's schedule for the 2007–2008 season. In April 2008 it was announced that CBC had cancelled the show.

Celebrities profiled included Don Cherry, Chantal Kreviazuk, Shaun Majumder, Sonja Smits, Randy Bachman, Mary Walsh, Margot Kidder, Lewis MacKenzie, Steven Page, Avi Lewis, Margaret Trudeau, Scott Thompson and Measha Brueggergosman.

After a four-year absence, the show was rebroadcast during the 2012–13 season with guest host Jeff Douglas. However, only 7 of the original 13 episodes were rebroadcast: Cherry, Kreviazuk, Page, Bachman, Trudeau, Majumder, and Bruegergosman.

Episodes
The list of twelve of the thirteen participants in season 1 was announced in late June 2007. Locations visited in the first season include India, Poland, Republic of Ireland, the Netherlands, Germany, Singapore, England and France, and the U.S. cities of Pittsburgh and New York City.

Reception
In reviewing the first episode The Gazette says, "Who Do You Think You Are? is a stirring, thought-provoking look at what it means to be Canadian."
The Ottawa Citizen noted that Thursday nights are the most competitive time of the week for broadcast networks and that many of the most-watched shows are on that night. They continue, "If you're looking for something a little out of the ordinary, though, give Who Do You Think You Are? a chance. You may be pleasantly surprised by what you find."

As part of announcing the show's return CBC reported that the first season had an average audience through the first nine episodes of 708,000 viewers and that the audience skewed towards females and those with post-secondary education.

References

External links
Who Do You Think You Are?

CBC Television original programming
2007 Canadian television series debuts
2008 Canadian television series endings
2000s Canadian documentary television series
English-language television shows
Television series about family history